New Zealand (abbreviated NZL) sent a team of 200 competitors and 102 officials to the 2002 Commonwealth Games, which were held at Manchester, England. The flagbearer at the opening ceremony was Sarah Ulmer, and at the closing ceremony was Nigel Avery.

New Zealand has competed in every Games, starting with the first British Empire Games in 1930 at Hamilton, Ontario.

Medals

Gold
Athletics:
 Beatrice Faumuina, women's discus throw

Cycling:
 Greg Henderson, men's points race
 Sarah Ulmer, women's individual pursuit

Lawn bowls:
 Joanna Edwards, Sharon Sims, women's pairs

Rugby sevens:
 Craig De Goldi, Brad Fleming, Chris Masoe, Mils Muliaina, Craig Newby, Roger Randle, Bruce Reihana, Eric Rush, Rodney So'oialo, Karl Te Nana, Anthony Tuitavake, Amasio Valence, men's rugby sevens

Shooting:
 Teresa Borrell, Nadine Stanton, women's double trap (pairs)

Squash:
 Carol Owens, Leilani Joyce, women's doubles
 Leilani Joyce, Glen Wilson, mixed doubles

Table tennis:
 Chunli Li, women's singles

Weightlifting:
 Nigel Avery, men's +105kg clean & jerk
 Nigel Avery, men's +105kg total

Silver
Athletics:
 Craig Barrett, men's 50km walk
 Philip Jensen, men's hammer throw
 Valerie Vili, women's shot put

Badminton:
 Nicole Gordon, Sara Petersen, women's doubles

Cycling:
 Susy Pryde, women's cross country

Hockey:
 Ryan Archibald, Michael Bevin, Phil Burrows, Dean Couzins, Dion Gosling, Bevan Hari, Blair Hopping, David Kosoof, Wayne McIndoe, Umesh Parag, Mitesh Patel, Hayden Shaw, Darren Smith, Peter Stafford, Simon Towns, Paul Woolford, men's hockeyNetball: Sheryl Clarke, Jenny-May Coffin, Belinda Colling, Vilimaina Davu, Donna Loffhagen, Lesley Nicol, Anna Rowberry, Julie Seymour, Irene Van Dyk, Anna Veronese, Daneka Wipiiti, women's netballShooting: Nadine Stanton, women's double trapSquash: Carol Owens, women's singlesSwimming: Elizabeth Van Welie, women's 400m individual medleyTable tennis: Chunli Li, Karen Li, women's doublesWeightlifting: Nigel Avery, men's +105kg snatch
 Olivia Baker, women's +75kg snatch

BronzeBadminton: Geoff Bellingham, Chris Blair, John Gordon, Nicole Gordon, Rebecca Gordon, Tammy Jenkins, Rhona Robertson, Sara Petersen, Daniel Shirley, mixed team event
 Sara Petersen, Daniel Shirley, mixed doublesBoxing: Shane Cameron, men's 81-91kg (heavyweight)
 Danny Codling, men's 64-69kg (welterweight)Cycling: Greg Henderson, Matthew Randall, Hayden Roulston, Lee Vertongen, men's team pursuitJudo: Tim Slyfield, men's 73-81kg (half-middleweight)Lawn bowls: Marlene Castle, women's singles
 Wendy Jensen, Patsy Jorgensen, Jan Khan, Anne Lomas, women's fours
 Mike Kernaghan, men's singlesShooting: Diane Collings, Open fullbore
 Tania Corrigan, Jocelyn Lees, women's 25m pistol (pairs)
 Juliet Etherington, women's 50m prone rifle
 Jocelyn Lees, women's 25m PistolSwimming: Toni Jeffs, women's 50m freestyleTable tennis: Peter Jackson, Chunli Li, mixed doubles
 Chunli Li, Karen Li, Tracey McLauchlan, Laura-Lee Smith, women's teamTriathlon: Hamish Carter, men's individualWeightlifting:'''
 Olivia Baker, women's +75kg clean & jerk
 Olivia Baker, women's +75kg total
 Terry Hughes, men's 62kg clean & jerk
 Terry Hughes, men's 62kg total

New Zealand's team at the Games

Athletics

Men's competition
Michael Aish
Craig Barrett
Phil Costley
John Henwood
Philip Jensen
Craig Kirkwood
Dallas Roberts
Tony Sargisson
Jonathan Wyatt

Women's competition
Valerie Adams
Jane Arnott
Chantal Brunner
Beatrice Faumuina
Gabrielle Gorst
Melina Hamilton
Tasha Williams

Field hockey

Men's team competition
Ryan Archibald
Michael Bevin
Phil Burrows
Dean Couzins
Dion Gosling
Bevan Hari
Blair Hopping
David Kosoof
Wayne McIndoe
Umesh Parag
Mitesh Patel
Hayden Shaw
Darren Smith
Peter Stafford
Simon Towns
Paul Woolford

Women's team competition
Sandy Bennett
Helen Clarke
Tara Drysdale
Paula Enoka
Amanda Christie
Anne-Marie Irving
Caryn Paewai
Suzie Pearce
Jaimee Provan
Niniwa Roberts
Rachel Robertson
Moira Senior
Colleen Gubb-Suddaby
Rachel Sutherland
Michelle Turner
Diana Weavers

Judo

Men's competition
Gareth Knight
Andrew Ross
Timothy Slyfield

Women's competition
Mellissa Jones
Elinore Stallworthy
Rochelle Stormont

Shooting
 (incomplete)

Men's competition
Mike Collings 
Greg Yelavich

Women's competition
Teresa Borrell
Diane Collings 
Tania Corrigan, 
Juliet Etherington
Jocelyn Lees
Nadine Stanton

Swimming

Men's competition
Moss Burmester
Cameron Gibson
Dean Kent
Nicholas Sheeran
Jonathan Winter

Women's competition
Charlotte Glynan
Melissa Ingram
Toni Jeffs
Hannah Mclean
Vivienne Rignall
Anna Thomas
Elizabeth Van Welie

See also
New Zealand Olympic Committee
New Zealand at the Commonwealth Games
New Zealand at the 2000 Summer Olympics
New Zealand at the 2004 Summer Olympics

External links
NZOC website on the 2002 games
Commonwealth Games Federation website

2002
Nations at the 2002 Commonwealth Games
Commonwealth Games